Toorongo is a locality in Victoria, Australia, located within the Shires of Baw Baw and Yarra Ranges local government areas.

History
Toorongo Valley Post Office opened on 14 September 1914 and closed the next year. A Toorongo Falls Telegraph Office remained open until 1942.

See also

References

Towns in Victoria (Australia)
Yarra Ranges